The 2nd Battlecruiser Squadron was a Royal Navy squadron of battlecruisers that saw service as part of the Grand Fleet during the First World War.

August 1914
In August 1914, the 2nd Battlecruiser Squadron was in the Mediterranean, and consisted of:

1915
On 15 January 1915,  became flagship of the 2nd BCS. She was replaced as flagship by the Australian battlecruiser  on 8 February 1915.

With the transfer of HMS Inflexible and Indomitable to the newly created 3rd Battlecruiser Squadron during 1915, the squadron was left with three ships, namely HMS New Zealand and Indefatigable, and HMAS Australia.

Battle of Jutland
HMAS Australia was damaged in collision with HMS New Zealand on 22 April 1916, and did not participate in the Battle of Jutland on 31 May 1916. The 2nd BCS therefore consisted of:

HMS New Zealand Flagship of Rear Admiral W. C. Pakenham; Captain J. F. E. Green
HMS Indefatigable Captain C. F. Sowerby

HMS New Zealand sustained light damage during the engagement; however, HMS Indefatigable was sunk by the German battlecruiser .

After Jutland
With the loss of three battlecruisers at Jutland, the Royal Navy reverted to two Battlecruiser squadrons. For the remainder of the war, the squadron comprised:

HMAS Australia
HMS New Zealand
HMS Inflexible
HMS Indomitable

Rear-Admirals commanding
Post holders included:

References

External links
Composition of the Grand Fleet

Battlecruiser squadrons of the Royal Navy
Military units and formations of the Royal Navy in World War I